Gbélo  is a town in the far west of Ivory Coast. It is a sub-prefecture of Ouaninou Department in Bafing Region, Woroba District.

Gbélo was a commune until March 2012, when it became one of 1126 communes nationwide that were abolished.
In 2014, the population of the sub-prefecture of Ouaninou was 20,790.

Villages
The forty one villages of the sub-prefecture of Ouaninou and their population in 2014 are:

Notes

Sub-prefectures of Bafing Region
Former communes of Ivory Coast